Gregory Bretz (born December 19, 1990 in Anaheim, California) is an American snowboarder who has competed since 2004.  His first and to date only World Cup victory was in Canada in the halfpipe event in 2008.

It was announced on January 26, 2010 that Bretz made the US team for the 2010 Winter Olympics in Vancouver.

Based in Mammoth Lakes, California Greg Bretz was also named to the US snowboard Olympic halfpipe team in 2014, to be held in Sochi, Russia. He placed 12th in the men's half pipe final.

References

1990 births
American male snowboarders
Living people
Olympic snowboarders of the United States
Snowboarders at the 2010 Winter Olympics
Snowboarders at the 2014 Winter Olympics
People from Mammoth Lakes, California
X Games athletes
21st-century American people